Olga Shatylo (born August 12, 1984) is a Ukrainian Paralympic volleyballist who won a bronze medal at the 2012 Summer Paralympics in sitting volleyball competition. She graduated from Kyiv Polytechnic Institute in Kyiv, Ukraine.

References

1984 births
Paralympic volleyball players of Ukraine
Paralympic bronze medalists for Ukraine
Living people
Medalists at the 2012 Summer Paralympics
Volleyball players at the 2012 Summer Paralympics
Ukrainian sitting volleyball players
Women's sitting volleyball players
Paralympic medalists in volleyball